The JGR Class 860 was the first steam railway locomotive built in Japan. The compound design reduced coal consumption by 15 to 20 percent, but the locomotive was difficult to handle, so no more of the type were built. The locomotive spent its last years on Sakhalin.

See also
 Japan Railways locomotive numbering and classification

References

2-4-2T locomotives
Steam locomotives of Japan
1067 mm gauge locomotives of Japan
Individual locomotives of Japan
Scrapped locomotives